Interstate 110 (I-110) is a  freeway spur route in Biloxi, Mississippi, running south from I-10 to U.S. Route 90 (US 90). It is one of very few places on the Interstate Highway System utilizing a drawbridge. The southbound control city is Biloxi, with a series of bridges out over the Gulf of Mexico at the southern terminus. There is no northbound control city; the road is marked with trailblazers reading "TO I-10" instead. It ran entirely concurrently with Mississippi Highway 15 (MS 15), until MS 15 was truncated to I-10.

The route of I-110 is defined in Mississippi Code Annotated § 65-3-3.

Route description

I-110 begins at an interchange with US 90 on the Gulf of Mexico in Biloxi. The ramps to and from US 90 eastbound pass over the gulf and the beach. From US 90, the ramps from eastbound US 90 and from westbound US 90 merge, and the route heads north as a four-lane freeway through residential and commercial areas, passing over CSX's NO&M Subdivision railroad line. The highway comes to a southbound exit and northbound entrance serving Division Street. Farther north, I-110 comes to a southbound exit and northbound entrance with Bayview Avenue. After this, the freeway crosses the Biloxi Bay on a drawbridge into D'Iberville. Here, the road comes to a diverging diamond interchange with Rodriguez Street and continues north through areas of homes and businesses. I-110 reaches its northern terminus at a cloverleaf interchange with I-10, at which point the road continues north as MS 15/MS 67.

History

Completed in the late 1980s, it is the latest interstate to be numbered I-110.

In 2012, Mississippi Department of Transportation (MDOT) officials started a project to extend I-110 past the Sangani Boulevard intersection across the Tchoutacabouffa River back into Biloxi city proper to end at an intersection with Brandon James Drive. The extension would include a new overpass for Sangani Boulevard/Promanade Parkway and a new interstate-grade intersection between I-110 and Sangani/Promanade. The project was slated to be completed in the middle of 2013.

Exit list

References

External links

 Interstate 110 Mississippi @ Interstate-Guide.com
 Mississippi @ SouthEastRoads.com - Interstate 110
 Kurumi - I-110 Mississippi

10-1 Mississippi
10-1
1 Mississippi
Transportation in Harrison County, Mississippi